Edwin Watenya Sifuna (born 22 May 1982) is a Kenyan politician and the current Senator of Nairobi County after being elected in the 2022 Kenyan general election. He is the Secretary-General of ODM Party and the deputy minority whip in the Senate of Kenya.

Education
Sifuna started his formal education at Kakamega Township Primary School and later on joined Musingu High School where he sat for his KCSE exams. Thereafter, he pursued a Bachelor of Law from the University of Nairobi, graduating in 2006. After receiving his Post Graduate Diploma from the Kenya School of Law in 2007, Sifuna did his pupilage at Kairu & McCourt Advocates in Nairobi and was thereafter admitted to the Roll of Advocates in 2008.

Political career
The name Sifuna is not new to Kenyan politics. His uncle Lawrence Sifuna was a former member of Parliament for Buluma and was among the Seven Bearded Sisters. 

In 2013 Sifuna became a member of CORD as a Technical/Advisory Committee Member for three years before joining the NASA in the same capacity. In the 2017 Kenyan general election, Edwin Sifuna expressed his interest to vie for the Kanduyi Constituency Member of Parliament seat on an ODM Party ticket. He was however not successful during the primaries in April where he lost to John Makali. 

With only about two months to the general elections in August, ODM fronted Sifuna as their preferred candidate to contest the Nairobi senatorial seat then held by Mike Sonko. He polled 674,056 votes (42,51%) against winner Johnson Sakaja who got 811,826 votes (51,20%). 

In February 2018, Sifuna was picked as the Secretary-General of ODM party to replace Ababu Namwamba. In 2019 he was elected to serve as the Vice-chair of the Centre for Multiparty Democracy (CMD). 

In the 2022 Kenyan general election, Sifuna once again  contested the Nairobi Senatorial seat. He garnered 716,876 to clinch the seat and is now serving the people of Nairobi as their senator. In February 2023 he assumed the role of deputy minority whip in the Senate.

Professional career
Sifuna started work as a Records officer at the Kenya Commercial Bank, Kencom Branch in Nairobi. He then moved to Mini Group of Companies as the Legal &  Administration Officer for about a year. It was at Magnate Ventures Limited serving as the Legal & Admin Manager that Sifuna worked the longest. After about three years he started his law firm E. Sifuna & Associates, where he is the Managing Partner. He is a member of LSK.

Personal life
Edwin Sifuna was born on 22 May 1982 at St. Mary's Hospital in Mumias, Kakamega County. His father was a civil servant with the defunct Municipal Council and his mother, a now-retired teacher from Moi Primary School in Bungoma. He has two brothers and two sisters. He is married with a daughter. When he is not working in his political or legal capacity, he enjoys PlayStation and watching football. He is a supporter of A.F.C. Leopards and Chelsea F.C. and is a baptized Catholic Church member.

References

External links
Sen Sifuna Edwin Wetanya @Parliament 
Sifuna Edwin Wetanya @Mzalendo 
Edwin Sifuna @LSK

1982 births
Living people
Members of the Senate of Kenya
Orange Democratic Movement politicians
21st-century Kenyan lawyers
21st-century Kenyan politicians
University of Nairobi alumni
Local politicians in Kenya
Kenya School of Law alumni
Kenyan politicians
Kenyan Luhya people
Members of the 13th Parliament of Kenya